FunHouse is a pinball machine designed by Pat Lawlor and released in November 1990 by Williams Electronics. Starring a talking ventriloquist dummy named Rudy, the game is themed after the concept of an amusement park funhouse. FunHouse is one of the last Williams games to use an alphanumeric display; the company switched to dot matrix the following year.

Description

FunHouse'''s primary feature is the talking head of a ventriloquist dummy, named Rudy, located in the top right corner of the playfield.  Rudy responds to events in the game, including informing the player of special bonuses, taunting and heckling the player, and appearing to follow the ball with its eyes when certain targets are hit.  Rudy is voiced by Ed Boon, and the technology behind Rudy's facial movements was dubbed "Pin-Mation" by Williams.

Gameplay
The game's overall theme is that of a funhouse, with the player taking on the role of a visitor to see its attractions.  The overall goal of the game is to advance the "game time" to midnight and cause the FunHouse to close, allowing the player to start multiball mode.  A secondary goal of the game is to complete the "Mystery Mirror" by lighting all of its modes, starting "Super Frenzy" mode.  The game is over when the player has lost all balls, including any extra balls earned.

Every target and ramp has a name and function following the funhouse theme.  Aside from Rudy himself, the game's main feature is a virtual clock in the center of the playfield, which advances the current time by increments of differing numbers of minutes with each successful shot.  When the clock reaches 11:30, it stops advancing and the game announces that the FunHouse will close in thirty minutes.  Making a successful shot to the "Hidden Hallway" locks the current ball and advances the clock to 11:45.  Making this shot again locks the second ball and advances the clock to midnight.  Rudy then falls asleep and his mouth remains open - to start Multiball, the player must shoot a ball into Rudy's mouth.  While at least two balls are in play, the player can score a Jackpot by shooting the Trap Door next to Rudy while it is open.  When multiball mode ends, the time resets to an earlier "opening" time, and single-ball mode continues as before. 

As with most pinball machines, a mystery score is given once the player has been given five extra balls, for each one earned hereafter.

Legacy
The 1993 Williams pinball table Twilight Zone includes music and quotes from the game as part of its "Fast Lock" mode, and a different quote as a hidden surprise in its "Clock Chaos" mode.

The 1994 Williams pinball table Red & Ted's Road Show includes two animating heads which work similarly to Rudy.FunHouse was available as a licensed table of The Pinball Arcade until June 30th 2018 when the license with WMS expired. The table is also included in Pinball Hall of Fame: The Williams Collection and the arcade game UltraPin.  With the license for digital recreations of WMS Industries tables being passed to Zen Studios, the company announced in 2020 that FunHouse will be among a forthcoming sixth wave of tables to be included in its own curation of Williams pinball tables as downloadable content for Pinball FX 3.

See alsoComet - a pinball machine by Williams released in 1985 featuring an amusement park themeCyclone'' - a pinball machine by Williams released in 1988 featuring an amusement park theme

References

External links
 
Restored Funhouse Videos and Images
The GameRoom Blog: Funhouse Pinball Review

Williams pinball machines
1990 pinball machines